Olga Liashchuk (born 1 June 1985) is a Ukrainian pro Strongwoman from Donetsk. She is a 2 x time Arnold Pro Strongwoman champion and the reigning World's Strongest Woman.

Career
Olga loved sports from her childhood and started athletics at a young age. As a teenager, she Pole vaulted  outdoors and  indoors. Olga entered the 2016 Arnold Amateur Strongwoman World Championships in Columbus, Ohio and emerged 3rd place. Taking part in mainstream strongwoman competitions in ensuing years, she won the World's Strongest Woman in Daytona Beach, Florida, the Strongest Woman in the World in Las Vegas, Nevada and became the first and only athlete to win the Arnold Pro Strongwoman in Columbus, Ohio two consecutive times. Olga also held two Guinness World Records for the fastest time to crush 3 watermelons between the thighs, with a time of 14.65 seconds in 2014 and with a time of 7.59 seconds in 2018.
 
Olga has competed in 14 international strongwoman competitions and is a 6 time champion, making her one of the most accomplished professional strongwomen in history.

Personal records
Rogue Elephant Bar Deadlift –  raw with straps (2023 Arnold Strongwoman Classic)
Hummer tire Deadlift –  15" from the floor (2022 Arnold Pro Strongwoman)
Axle Deadlift (for reps) –  for 10 reps (2022 World’s Strongest Woman)
Deadlift (for reps) –  for 15 reps (2019 Arnold Pro Strongwoman)
Log press/ American Oak (for reps) –  for 4 reps (2023 Arnold Strongwoman Classic)
Circus Dumbbell press (for reps) –  x 5 reps (2020 Arnold Pro Strongwoman)
Circus Dumbbell press (medley) – 4 Dumbbells  in 57.97 seconds (2022 World’s Strongest Woman)
Super Yoke –  (24 meter course) in 18.46 seconds (2022 Shaw Classic Open - Women)
Car Walk –  (10 meter course) in 8.87 seconds (2022 World's Strongest Woman)
Atlas Stones – 6 Stones weighing  in 37.16 seconds (2022 World's Strongest Woman)
Tire flip –  for 9 reps (2020 Arnold Pro Strongwoman)
Sandbag to shoulder –  4 bags in 40.61 seconds (2022 World's Strongest Woman)
Conan's Wheel of Pain –  18.19 meters (59 ft 8 in) (2023 Arnold Strongwoman Classic)

Competitive record
Winning percentage: 42.9%Podium percentage: 78.6%

References

1985 births
Living people
Ukrainian strength athletes